Riad Mohamed El Sunbati, also written as Riad Sonbati or Riadh Sonbati (30 November 1906 – 10 September 1981) was a 20th-century Egyptian composer and musician who was considered an icon of Egyptian Music. The number of his lyric works is 539 works in Egyptian Opera, operetta, cinematic and religious song, poem, Taqtouqa and Mawalia. The number of song poets who he composed for is more than 120 poets. He composed for many famous Arab singers including Umm Kulthum, Fairouz (yet to be released), Asmahan, Warda Al-Jazairia, Najat Al Saghira, Mounira El Mahdeya, Fayza Ahmed, Saleh Abdel Hai, and Aziza Galal (who was the last singer to sing one of his melodies).

Biography
Sunbati was the first born boy after eight girls in a family in the city of Faraskur, Damietta Governorate, Egypt on 30 November 1906. His father was a singer, singing in the mawlids, weddings and religious holidays in the nearby villages and towns. Riad used to listen to his father playing the oud and singing. When he was nine, his father caught him outside the school, hiding at the carpenter's sawmill playing the oud and singing Sayed Darwish, and decided to take him to sing in the weddings with him. The father didn't stay put in Faraskur but travelled with his family to Mansoura, Dakahlia, so the young Riad was placed in a kuttab school. However, his studies didn't interest him as much as music did.

The musical beginning
When Sunbati was nine he got a disease in his eyes which made it hard to read, so he gave up studying and his father started teaching him the basic principles of music and its rhythms instead. Sunbati showed a remarkable talent, and became the star of the band and its lead singer. Soon he earned himself the nickname Bulbul al-Mansoura بلبل المنصورة (The nightingale of Mansoura). When, Sayed Darwish first heard Sunbati he invited him to come with him to Alexandria to have better chances, but Sunbati's father refused; he was depending on him in his band. In his early beginnings, he recorded several instrumental Oud improvisations for the german label Odeon.

Musical career
In 1928, Sunbati the father moved to Cairo with Riad, thinking that Riad deserved to prove himself in the artistic life, just like Umm Kulthum whose father was friend to Riad's father before moving to Cairo. In this year, Sunbati began a new stage in his life, he registered at the Arab Music Institute, and was appointed as a teacher for playing the oud and singing. From here, his fame grew, and his name began to appear in the celebrations of the institute as a skilled player. However, he stayed for only three years, after which he quit and decided to enter the world of composing. His first composition was a poem of Ahmed Shawqi which was composed and sung later by Mohammed Abdel Wahab (Maqadeer men Jafnayky), he also worked as an oudist and a vocalist in Mohamed abdelwahab's takht (ensemble) where he appears in his song ElNile Nagachi in the movie Alwarda AlBeyda. In the early 1930s, he started working with Audion records, a major egyptian recording studio where he recorded various taqsims of his own. Audion (أوديون) company introduced him as a composer for its famous singers like: Saleh Abdel Hai, Abdel-Ghani Al Sayed, Rajaa Abdo and Najat Ali. In 1979, Riad Al Sunbati received the prestigious UNESCO International Music Prize as a performer of the Oud becoming the first person from the middle east and the only Egyptian to receive that award. He was also known for his unique and original taqsims which are famous for being the most authentic Arabic taqsims of that periods which are widely used as a model of maqam music in middle-eastern music schools, a collection of his taqsims on major Arabic maqams was recorded later in his career. One of his most famous instrumental compositions is "longa riad" (also known as "longa sultani yigah") which is considered to be the most famous Arabic longa which was played by many western and Turkish orchestras and oudists.

Relation to Umm Kulthum
In the middle of the 1930s, Umm Kulthum became more and more famous across the Egyptian countryside and therefore Riad was looking forward to meeting her. Their first meeting occurred by chance at a train station. Riad Al Sunbati composed for Umm Kulthum for the first time, in the song Ala Balad El-Mahboub على بلد المحبوب (To the Country of the Beloved) in 1935 for her movie Wedad, and although Umm Kulthum refused to sing the song in the film she recorded it after the great success of the song. Her recording in turn which was a huge success. As a result, he then joined her artistic team, which included Mohamed El Qasabgi and Zakariyya Ahmad becoming her youngest composer at that time. He worked with Umm Kulthum in many of their songs for her films such as "ifrah ya Aalbi" إفرح يا قلبي which was considered to be the song where he developed his unique style. He composed over 200 songs for her, more than any other composer had. At the same time he composed Arab poems, which almost all other composers failed to do, so he deserved the name he was given from Umm Kulthum 'The Genius'. He was also one of the only composers whom Umm Kulthum highly respected his opinions and agreed to all his remarks and compositions.

He composed many classical master pieces for Umm Kulthum such as Robaa'eyat El Khayyam, the highly appreciated Persian poem of Omar Khayyam which was translated by Ahmed Rami to Arabic. He also composed many religious songs becoming the best composer of religious songs as Mohammed Abdel Wahab described him. One of his most known songs is "Zikrayat" whose overture is considered to be one of the longest in Arabic music and even longer than Abdelwahab's Inta Omri. Riad Al Sunbati used to record most of his compositions for Umm Kulthum in his own voice on separate discs as his first musical career has been singing

Al-Atlal

The song Al-Atlal الأطلال (The Ruins) is one of the Arab music classics. Many critics considered it 'The Crown of the Arab Song' and the best 20th century Arab song. It is considered by many the best of what Umm Kulthum sang, and the best of what Sunbati composed. Umm Kulthum sang Al-Atlal in 1966 after two years from Mohammed Abdel Wahab's first song to Umm Kulthum, Inta Omri إنت عمري (You are My Life), and it had the same huge success.

Acting career

1952 was the start of Sunbati's acting career when he took the leading role with Huda Sultan in the film "Habeeb Alby" (The love of my heart) becoming his first and last experience as an actor. He later refused other roles as an actor as he preferred his job as a composer as he believed "Acting was not his thing". He also wrote the musical score for the film as well as the song "Fadel Youmeen" (Two days left) he performed in the film.

Discography

Compositions for Other Artists

Most notable compositions for Umm Kulthum include:

 Al-Atlal (the ruins)
 Robayyeat Al-khayyam (quatrains of Omar Khayyam)
 A'ala Balad elmahboob (to the country of the beloved)
 Ifrah ya Alby
 Ya lelet el eid
 Zikrayat
 Yally Kan yeshgeek aneeny
 Lessa Faker
 Hayyart Albi ma'ak
 Awidt E'iny
 El alb ye'eshaq kol Gameel
 Men agl Aynayk
 Hadeeth Alrooh
 Thawrat Alshak
 Arooh le meen
 Arak A'asy alDama'
 Al Thulatheya Al-Muqadasa
 Nahj Al Borda

Songs performed by Riad Al Sunbati
 Ashwaq
 Ilah alkoon
 Raby sobhanak dawman

Compositions:
Longa Farahfaza (longa Riad)
Shanghai Dance

Film scores 
 1949: Al lailu lana

See also
Al-Atlal
Arab music
Umm Kulthum

References

External links
 

1906 births
1981 deaths
Egyptian musicians
Egyptian composers
People from Damietta Governorate